Boulgou is one of the 45 provinces of Burkina Faso and is in Centre-Est Region. The capital of Boulgou is Tenkodogo. The population of Boulgou in 2019 was 736,559.

Departments
The province of Boulgou is divided into 13 departments.

See also:
Regions of Burkina Faso
Provinces of Burkina Faso
Communes of Burkina Faso

References 

 
Provinces of Burkina Faso